Vysočanská is a Prague Metro station on Line B, situated in Vysočany, next to Praha-Vysočany railway station. The station was opened on 8 November 1998 as part of the extension of Line B from Českomoravská to Černý Most.

References

External links

 Gallery and information 

Prague Metro stations
Railway stations opened in 1998
1998 establishments in the Czech Republic
Railway stations in the Czech Republic opened in the 20th century